Cacoxenite is an iron aluminium phosphate mineral with formula: Fe3+24Al(PO4)17O6(OH)12·17(H2O). Cacoxenite is associated with iron ores. The name comes from the Greek κăκός for "bad" or "evil" and ξένος for "guest" because the phosphorus content of cacoxenite lessens the quality of iron smelted from ore containing it.

It was first described in 1825 for an occurrence in the Hrbek Mine, Bohemia, Czech Republic.  It occurs as a secondary phase in oxidized magnetite and limonite deposits. It also occurs in novaculites and in iron and phosphorus rich sediments.

References

Phosphate minerals
Hexagonal minerals
Minerals in space group 176